Tin Hau is a station on the  of the Hong Kong MTR rapid transit system.

Location
Like all other Island line stations, Tin Hau is located along the northern shore of Hong Kong Island. Named after the nearby Tin Hau Temple, the station is actually at the core of the Causeway Bay neighbourhood; however the station's presence has caused the surrounding area to be colloquially called "Tin Hau".

The station lies to the east of Victoria Park, with the Citicorp Centre to the north. The Hong Kong Central Library and Lin Fa Kung Garden are to the south of the station, as is the Causeway Bay Sports Ground.

History
Tin Hau station was part of the original plan for the MTR, dating back to the Hong Kong Mass Transport Study in 1967. It was not, however, in the Modified Initial System, which laid out the first few phases of the MTR system. Construction on the Island line began in 1981, with the first section of the line, which included Tin Hau, opening on 31 May 1985. The Causeway Bay Magistracy was demolished to make way for the station, with the magistrates' courts moving to the Wanchai Tower. From 2000, MTR retrofitted platform screen doors at thirty underground stations, one of them being Tin Hau; the project was finished in 2006.

Station layout
Due to the limited space beneath Causeway Road and Hennessy Road, under which the Island line runs, Tin Hau utilises a stacked platform layout. Eastbound trains using platform 1 stop on the upper level, while westbound trains using platform 2 stop on the lower level. In addition, there are two underground levels above the platforms: the concourse containing faregates and shops and the walkway which connects Exits A1-A2 and B.

Entrances and exits
A1: King's Road
A2: Victoria Park, Causeway Bay Market
B: Hong Kong Central Library

Services
Tin Hau station acts as an interchange between MTR rapid transit and local buses.

References

Causeway Bay
Tin Hau, Hong Kong
Wan Chai District
MTR stations on Hong Kong Island
Island line (MTR)
Railway stations in Hong Kong opened in 1985
1985 establishments in Hong Kong